Jorn Vancamp (born 28 October 1998) is a Belgian professional footballer who plays as a forward for OH Leuven U23.

Club career
Vancamp joined Anderlecht's youth academy. He made his first team debut on 25 September 2016 against K.V.C. Westerlo replacing Nicolae Stanciu after 88 minutes. On 8 December 2016, Vancamp made his debut in the UEFA Europa League as a starter, he played in the group stage a match against Saint-Étienne, he was replaced by Łukasz Teodorczyk in the 60th minute of a 3–2 home defeat. In July 2017, Vancamp was signed by Eredivisie side Roda JC for the 2017–18 season. On 13 August, he made his debut for the club in Eredivisie in a 4–2 away defeat against PEC Zwolle playing the full match.

Vancamp joined Beerschot on a permanent deal after returning from his loan at Roda JC. He was sent on a one-season loan to Dutch second-tier Eerste Divisie club FC Eindhoven on 5 October 2020.

On 9 January 2022, Vancamp joined Ilves in Finland on a contract until July 2022, with an option to extend.

References

External links
 

1998 births
Living people
People from Hoboken
Footballers from Antwerp
Association football forwards
Belgian footballers
R.S.C. Anderlecht players
Roda JC Kerkrade players
K Beerschot VA players
FC Eindhoven players
FC Ilves players
Belgian Pro League players
Challenger Pro League players
Eredivisie players
Eerste Divisie players
Veikkausliiga players
Kakkonen players
Belgium youth international footballers
Belgian expatriate footballers
Expatriate footballers in Finland
Expatriate footballers in the Netherlands
Belgian expatriate sportspeople in Finland
Belgian expatriate sportspeople in the Netherlands